Alice Mumford is a Colombia-born painter born in 1965.

Biography
Mumford attended Dartington Hall School between 1978 and 1982 before studying at Southwark College of Art and Design in London until 1984. She studied at the Camberwell School of Arts and Crafts from 1984 to 1987 and enrolled for a master's degree at Falmouth College of Art in 1995. Mumford lives and works in Cornwall and teaches life drawing and painting at St Ives School of Painting and is an Academician of the Royal West of England Academy. Professor Richard Demarco has said of her work "I delight in the mark-making of Alice Mumford. Her brush strokes animate the surface of paper, canvas and board." Mumford often uses reflected images in her paintings, painting the mirror image of an object rather than the object itself to create a sense of space. Mumford has featured in a number of group exhibitions at the Rainyday Gallery in Penzance from 1996 and at the Covent Garden Gallery in 1988 and at the Great Atlantic Map Works  in St Just during 1999. Solo shows included one at Cobra & Bellamy in 2001 and at Julian Lax in 2003. In 2018 Mumford won the David Simon Contemporary Award  at the 165th Annual Open Exhibition of the Royal West of England Academy.

See also 
 List of St. Ives artists

References

External links
 Official website
 Colour from Coast to Coast, book about Mumford containing essays by Ian Massey and Professor Richard Demarco

1965 births
Living people
20th-century British women artists
21st-century British women artists
Alumni of Camberwell College of Arts
Alumni of Falmouth University
British painters
British women painters
British contemporary painters
St Ives artists
People educated at Dartington Hall School